Eagle River Union Airport  is a city owned public use airport located in Eagle River, a city in Vilas County, Wisconsin, United States. It is included in the Federal Aviation Administration (FAA) National Plan of Integrated Airport Systems for 2021–2025, in which it is categorized as a local general aviation facility.

Facilities and aircraft 
Eagle River Union Airport covers an area of 588 acres (238 ha) at an elevation of 1,642 feet (500 m) above mean sea level. It has two asphalt paved runways: 4/22 is 5,000 by 75 feet (1,524 x 23 m) and 13/31 is 3,400 by 60 feet (1,036 x 18 m). It also has one helipad designated H1 with a concrete surface measuring 60 by 60 feet (18 x 18 m). Runway 4/22 has approved LOC/DME, GPS and VOR/DME approaches.

For the 12-month period ending August 20, 2020, the airport had 11,598 aircraft operations, an average of 32 per day: 87% general aviation, 13% air taxi, less than 1% scheduled commercial and less than 1% military. In February 2023, there were 42 aircraft based at this airport: 35 single-engine, 4 multi-engine, 1 jet and 2 helicopter.

See also 
 List of airports in Wisconsin

References

External links 
 Eagle River Airport
  at Wisconsin DOT Airport Directory
 

Airports in Wisconsin
Buildings and structures in Vilas County, Wisconsin